Artem Alekseevich Anisimov (born 24 May 1988) is a Russian professional ice hockey centre who currently plays for the Lehigh Valley Phantoms of the American Hockey League (AHL). Anisimov has previously played in the National Hockey League (NHL) for the New York Rangers,  Columbus Blue Jackets, Chicago Blackhawks and Ottawa Senators. The Rangers originally selected him in the second round, 54th overall, of the 2006 NHL Entry Draft

Playing career
Anisimov is a product of the Lokomotiv Yaroslavl hockey school. He made his semi-professional debut for the organization's junior farm club, Lokomotiv-2, during the 2004–05 season before joining the senior team in the 2005–06 season. At the end of the campaign, Anisimov was drafted in the second round, 54th overall, in the 2006 NHL Entry Draft by the New York Rangers.

New York Rangers
On 2 August 2007, Anisimov signed his first contract with the Rangers, later joining the team's American Hockey League (AHL) affiliate, the Hartford Wolf Pack, for the 2008–09 season.

On 23 January 2009, Anisimov was selected to participate in the 2009 AHL All-Star Classic in Worcester, Massachusetts, representing the PlanetUSA team. He scored one goal and assisted on two others, including the game-winner, in a 14–11 PlanetUSA victory over the Canadian All-Stars. On 1 February, Anisimov was called up to the Rangers for the first time in his career after scoring 21 goals and 29 assists for 50 points with the Wolf Pack. He made his NHL debut on 3 February against the Atlanta Thrashers at Madison Square Garden.

Anisimov scored his first career NHL goal on 11 October 2009, during the 2009–10 season against goaltender Jean-Sébastien Giguère of the Anaheim Ducks in a 3–0 Rangers victory.

On 8 July 2011, Anisimov, a restricted free agent, re-signed with the Rangers on a two-year, $3.75 million contract.

Columbus Blue Jackets
Just one season into his contract, Anisimov, along with Brandon Dubinsky, Tim Erixon and a first-round draft pick in 2013 (19th overall, used to select Kerby Rychel), were traded to the Columbus Blue Jackets in exchange for Rick Nash, Steven Delisle and a 2013 conditional third-round pick.

On 26 June 2013, Anisimov signed a three-year contract extension with the Blue Jackets at an annual average value of $3.28 million.

Chicago Blackhawks
On 30 June 2015, Anisimov, along with Jeremy Morin, Marko Daňo and Corey Tropp, were traded to the Chicago Blackhawks in exchange for Brandon Saad, Alex Broadhurst and Michael Paliotta. The next day, on 1 July, Anisimov agreed to a five-year, $22.75 million contract extension with Chicago. His existing contract was set to expire after the 2015–16 season.

On 9 October 2015, Anisimov scored the first goal in the first regular season game at Barclays Center against Thomas Greiss of the New York Islanders. The Blackhawks would win 3–2 in overtime. In his first year with the Blackhawks, he produced 20 goals and 22 assists as the Blackhawks lost in Game 7 of the first round of the 2016 Stanley Cup playoffs to the St. Louis Blues.

On 15 November 2017, Anisimov scored his first NHL hat-trick in a 6–3 win over the New York Rangers.

Ottawa Senators
After four seasons with the Blackhawks, Anisimov was traded to the Ottawa Senators in exchange for Zack Smith on 16 July 2019. Anisimov posted 15 goals and 5 assists in his first season with Ottawa.

Anisimov struggled to stay healthy during the  season and was placed on waivers after registering only four points in 14 games for the Senators on 29 March 2021. Unclaimed, Anisimov remained on the team and on 24 April, Anisimov suited up as an emergency goalie during a game against the Vancouver Canucks but did not play. He finished the season posting 9 points through 19 games.

Later years
As a free agent after two seasons with the Senators, Anisimov remained un-signed over the summer leading into the  season. On 9 September 2021, he accepted an invitation to attend the Colorado Avalanche 2021 training camp on a professional try-out contract. Following training camp and featuring in pre-season games with the contending Avalanche, Anisimov was released without a contract from Colorado on 8 October 2021. 

Returning to his native Russia, Anisimov linked up with his original hometown club, Lokomotiv Yaroslavl of the KHL, for the remainder of the season on 20 October 2021. As an alternate captain, Anisimov was leaned upon offensively and responded with 8 goals and 19 points through 27 regular season games. He added 3 points in 4 post-season games before Lokomotiv were eliminated in the first-round at the hands of eventual champions CSKA Moscow.

As a free agent and with ambitions to return to the NHL, Anisimov for a second consecutive season accepted a professional tryout contract by joining the Philadelphia Flyers 2022 training camp and pre-season. In suffering an injury through training camp, Anisimov remained within the organization to start the  season and after returning to health was later signed to a PTO with AHL affiliate, the Lehigh Valley Phantoms, on 15 November 2022. Anisimov tallied 4 points through his first 6 appearances with the Phantoms and on 10 December 2022 was signed to a AHL contract for the remainder of the season.

Personal life
Anisimov and his wife Ksenia have three children: a daughter, Adriana and 2 sons, Artemiy and Aleksander.

Career statistics

Regular season and playoffs

International

References

External links

1988 births
Living people
Chicago Blackhawks players
Columbus Blue Jackets players
Expatriate ice hockey players in Canada
Expatriate ice hockey players in the United States
Hartford Wolf Pack players
Lehigh Valley Phantoms players
Lokomotiv Yaroslavl players
New York Rangers draft picks
New York Rangers players
Ice hockey players at the 2014 Winter Olympics
Olympic ice hockey players of Russia
Ottawa Senators players
Russian expatriate ice hockey people
Russian expatriate sportspeople in Canada
Russian expatriate sportspeople in the United States
Russian ice hockey centres
Sportspeople from Yaroslavl